The Federation of Trade Unions of Kazakhstan (FTUK) is a national trade union center in Kazakhstan. It has a membership of 1.5 million, and is the successor organization to the official trade unions of the communist era.

FTUK is affiliated with the General Confederation of Trade Unions.

References

External links
 Official site

Trade unions in Kazakhstan
General Confederation of Trade Unions
National federations of trade unions